Deir Qanun also spelled Dayr Qanun is a village in southern Syria, administratively part of the Rif Dimashq Governorate, located northwest of Damascus in the Wadi Barada. Nearby localities include Ain al-Fijah, Deir Muqaran, al-Dimas, Jdeidat al-Wadi, Kfeir al-Zayt and Basimah. According to the Syria Central Bureau of Statistics, Deir Qanun had a population of 4,213 in the 2004 census.

History
Deir Qanun was visited by Syrian geographer Yaqut al-Hamawi in the early 13th-century, during Ayyubid rule. He noted that it was a village "in the neighborhood of Damascus."

In 1838 it was noted that the inhabitants were predominantly Sunni Muslims.

References

Bibliography

  

Populated places in Qudsaya District